B Train may refer to:
The B (New York City Subway service) in New York City
The Green Line B branch in Boston, Massachusetts
A B-Train or B-double, a road freight transport larger than a semi-trailer but not as long as a road train
B Line (Los Angeles Metro), a rapid transit line in Los Angeles County, California

See also
 B Line (disambiguation)